Loom of Fate is an adventure module published by White Wolf Publishing in February 1994, for use with the horror tabletop role-playing game Mage: The Ascension, and is part of the World of Darkness series.

Plot summary
Loom of Fate is an adventure module intended to be used with Mage: The Ascension, where players take the roles of mages, and follows the adventure in the first edition of the game's rulebook. The adventure is set in San Francisco, which is held together by the dying creature Cob, whose potential replacement is a young girl being pursued by multiple groups.

Production and release
Loom of Fate was released by White Wolf Publishing in February 1994.

Reviews
Dragon #212
Casus Belli V1 #94 (May 1996) p. 26-29
Alarums & Excursions (Issue 267 - Nov 1997)

References

Mage: The Ascension
Role-playing game adventures
Role-playing game supplements introduced in 1994